GMT 360 is a vehicle platform that was manufactured by General Motors from the 2002 and 2009 model years.  Designed primarily for SUVs, the GMT360 architecture served as the third generation of mid-size SUVs produced by GM.  Directly succeeding its GMT330 predecessor in the United States, GMT360 vehicles based on the platform were sold with their predecessor in Canada and export markets through 2005.         

The GMT360 architecture is among the most widely rebranded GM platforms in modern history.  Alongside its adoption by each GM brand (except Cadillac, Pontiac and Saturn), the SUV platform was additionally marketed by associated brand Isuzu.  Following the closure of Oldsmobile after the 2004 model year, its version was adopted by the Buick and Saab brands.  The architecture was sold as a five-door SUV, a long-wheelbase SUV (codenamed GMT370), a retractable-roof wagon/SUV/truck, and a hardtop convertible pickup truck.      

Originally slated to be replaced by a body-on-frame SUV (codenamed GMT361), the GMT360 chassis was discontinued after 2009 model year and replaced by two unibody-chassis vehicle platforms.  The GMT360 was replaced in 2010 by the Theta platform; the longer-wheelbase GMT370 was replaced by three-row Lambda platform vehicles (which also replaced all GM minivans).  The last GMT360 vehicles were assembled on December 23, 2008.

Chassis overview 
The first GM SUV platform not derived from pickup trucks, GMT360 retained body-on-frame construction with fully boxed hydroformed frame rails,  A 113-inch wheelbase was used, with GMT 370 released as a long-wheelbase variant (using a 129-inch wheelbase).  Rear-wheel drive was standard, with part-time four-wheel drive and all-wheel drive as options.  

The platform used double wishbone independent suspension in front, with a 5-link solid rear axle; auto-leveling air suspension was offered as an option for some versions.

Originally developed for the Atlas series of inline engines, in 2003, a 5.3L V8 was introduced as an option, with a 6.0L V8 becoming an option in 2006.  The 6.0L engine (RPO LS2) was used in the Trailblazer SS model and the Saab 9-7x Aero only, and was rated at 395 hp.  All engines were coupled to the 4L60-E/4L70-E 4-speed automatic transmission.

Applications

GMT 305
 2004–2005 GMC Envoy XUV

GMT 360
 2002–2009 Chevrolet TrailBlazer
 2002–2009 GMC Envoy
 2003–2008 Isuzu Ascender
 2002–2004 Oldsmobile Bravada
 2004–2007 Buick Rainier
 2005–2009 Saab 9-7X

GMT 368
 2003–2006 Chevrolet SSR

GMT 370
 2002–2006 Chevrolet TrailBlazer EXT
 2002–2006 GMC Envoy XL
 2003–2007 Isuzu Ascender

Gallery

See also
 GM GMT platform

General Motors platforms